Beker may refer to:

People
Avi Beker (born 1951), Israeli writer, statesman, and professor
Gisela Beker (born 1932), German-American artist
Jeanne Beker (born 1952), Canadian television personality, author and newspaper columnist
Nicolas Léonard Beker (1770–1840), French general
Beker Fabian (born 1963), Peruvian poet and writer

Other
 KNVB Beker, a Dutch soccer trophy
 Dutch Cup (ice hockey), also known as the Beker, a Dutch ice hockey trophy

See also
 Becker (surname)